Istiqlol futbol klubi is an Uzbek professional football club based in Fergana. The club plays in Uzbekistan Pro League.

History
The club was formed 2016 under the name Istiqlol in Fergana.

References

Football clubs in Uzbekistan
Association football clubs established in 2016
2016 establishments in Uzbekistan